The  Japan Series was the 38th edition of Nippon Professional Baseball's postseason championship series. It matched the Central League champion Yomiuri Giants against the Pacific League champion Seibu Lions. The Lions came into the series as the defending champions, having won the 1986 Japan Series. This was the Giants' 24th appearance in the Japan Series and first since 1983. The Lions defeated the Giants, 4 games to 2, and won their second championship in a row and seventh overall.

Summary

See also
1987 World Series

References

Japan Series
Saitama Seibu Lions
Yomiuri Giants
Japan Series
Japan Series
Japan Series
Japan Series
Japan Series